Chandannagore subdivision is an administrative subdivision of the Hooghly district in the state of West Bengal, India.

Overview 
A major portion of Chandannagore subdivision is part of the Hooghly-Damodar Plain, the agriculturally rich alluvial plains lying between the Hooghly and the Damodar. The narrow strip of land along the Hooghly is part of the Hooghly Flats. The entire area is a part of the Gangetic Delta. The Hooghly is a tidal river and has a high west bank. The Portuguese, the Dutch, the French, the Danes and the British dominated industry, trade and commerce in this area for more than two centuries, and as a result the Hooghly Flats is highly industrialised.

Subdivisions
The Hooghly district is divided into the following administrative subdivisions:

Administrative units
Chandannagore subdivision has 5 police stations, 3 community development blocks, 3 panchayat samitis, 41 gram panchayats, 352 mouzas, 339 inhabited villages, 1 municipal corporation, 3 municipalities and 7 census towns. The single municipal corporation is Chandernagore Municipal Corporation. The municipalities are Tarakeswar Municipality, Bhadreswar Municipality and Champdany Municipality. The census towns are: Bargachhia, Balarambati, Singur, Nasibpur, Jagatnagar, Baruipara and Borai. The subdivision has its headquarters at Chandannagar.

Kolkata Urban Agglomeration
The following Municipal Corporation and Municipalities in Chandannagore subdivision were part of Kolkata Urban Agglomeration in the 2011 census: Chandannagar (M Corp.), Bhadreswar (M) and Champdani (M).

Police stations
Police stations in Chandannagore subdivision have the following features and jurisdiction:

Blocks
Community development blocks in Chandannagore subdivision are:

Blocks Map

Gram panchayats
The subdivision contains 41 gram panchayats under 3 community development blocks:

 Haripal block consists of 15 gram panchayats, viz. Alipur Kashipur, Haripal Kingkarbati, Nalikul Purba, Pyantra, Bandipur, Haripal Sahadev, Narayanpur Bahirkhanda, Sripatipur Ilipur, Chandanpur, Jejur, Dwarhatta, Kaikala, Paschim Gopinathpur, Haripal Ashutosh and Nalikul Paschim.
 Singur block consists of 16 gram panchayats, viz. Anandanagar, Basubati, Gopalnagar, Singur–I, Bagdanga Chinamore, Beraberi, Kamarkundu Gopalnagar Daluigachha, Singur–II, Bainchipota, Bighati, Mirzapur Bankipur, Balarambati, Bora, Baruipara Paltagarh, Borai Pahalampur and Nasibpur.
 Tarakeswar block consists of ten gram panchayats, viz. Ashtara Dattapur, Bhanjipur, Naita Malpaharpur, Talpur, Baligori–I, Champadanga, Purba Ramnagar,  Baligori–II, Kesabchak and Santoshpur.

Economy

Industry
Chandannagore subdivision has five jute mills – Northbrook Jute Mill, Dalhousie Jute Mill, Angus Jute Works (all at Champdani under Bhadreswar police station), Victoria Jute Mill (at Telinipara) and Gondalpara Jute Works (at Gondalpara) – all along the Hooghly. Jute mills drew in a large labour force from the neighbouring states of Bihar and Orissa, as well as eastern Uttar Pradesh, quite often forming an overwhelming majority of the population in the area, living in shanty towns and bustees dotting the mill area. The proportion of migrants in the population was 80% in Bhadreswar. The entire jute industry is in a bad shape.

See also –  Victoria Jute Mill, a part of Indian heritage

Amongst the other well-known industrial units in Chandannagore subdivision are: Lagan Engineering and Braithwaite. Lagan Engineering is a jute machinery manufacturing company set up in 1955 in Angus in Champdani. The machinery it has manufactured has been functioning well in numerous jute mills. It has been modernising to keep abreast with the latest technological developments. It was initially set up by the Northern Ireland-based-James Mackie & Sons, run for a short period by the Government of India, which subsequently divested its shares to Murlidhar Ratanlal Exports Ltd. Braithwaite's Angus Works was set up at Champdani in 1960 for manufacturing cranes, foundry products and machinery components etc. In 2010, the administrative control of Braithwaite & Co. was taken over by the Ministry of Railways.

Singur gained international media attention since Tata Motors started constructing a factory to manufacture their $2,500 car, the Tata Nano at Singur. The small car was scheduled to roll out of the factory by 2008. In October 2008 Tatas announced withdrawal from the project. In 2016, the Supreme Court quashed the West Bengal government's acquisition of 997 acres of agricultural land for Tata Motors and ordered its return to 9,117 landowners.

Handloom weaving
The handloom sarees of Dhaniakhali, Begampur, Jangipara, Rajbalhat areas and dhutis of Haripal, Rajbalhat, Khanakul areas of Hooghly district are widely familiar.

Agriculture
Hooghly is an agriculturally prosperous district of West Bengal. Although the economy has been shifting away from agriculture, it is still the pre-dominant economic activity and the main source of livelihood for the rural people of the district. One third of the district income comes from agriculture. Given below is an overview of the agricultural production (all data in tonnes) for Chandannagore subdivision, other subdivisions and the Hooghly district, with data for the year 2013-14.

Poverty
The information given above leads us on to a comment in the District Human Development Report for Hooghly district: In the sub-division wise comparison of the levels of poverty in Hooghly district, Srirampur and Chandannagore share the lowest incidence of poverty.

Education
Hooghly district had a literacy rate of 81.80% as per the provisional figures of the census of India 2011. Chinsurah subdivision had a literacy rate of 79.17%, Chandannagore subdivision 83.01%, Srirampore subdivision 86.13% and Arambag subdivision 79.05.  

Given in the table below (data in numbers) is a comprehensive picture of the education scenario in Hooghly district for the year 2013-14:

Note: Primary schools include junior basic schools; middle schools, high schools and higher secondary schools include madrasahs; technical schools include junior technical schools, junior government polytechnics, industrial technical institutes, industrial training centres, nursing training institutes etc.; technical and professional colleges include engineering colleges, medical colleges, para-medical institutes, management colleges, teachers training and nursing training colleges, law colleges, art colleges, music colleges etc. Special and non-formal education centres include sishu siksha kendras, madhyamik siksha kendras, centres of Rabindra mukta vidyalaya, recognised Sanskrit tols, institutions for the blind and other handicapped persons, Anganwadi centres, reformatory schools etc.

The following institutions are located in Chandannagore subdivision:
Chandernagore College, is a general degree college at Chandannagar. It was established as St. Mary's Institution in 1862, raised to a First Arts level college in 1891, renamed College Dupleix in 1901. It was closed down in 1908 and reopened in 1931. In 1945, the college section was separated from the school section and renamed College de Bussy. It was renamed Chandernagore College in 1948. Chandannagar came under Indian Union on 2 May 1950 and was integrated with the state of West Bengal on 2 October 1954. The college was directly administered by the Government of West Bengal.
Sir J. C. Bose School of Engineering, an engineering college, established at Mankundu, Chandannagar in 2009.
Pearl Rosary School is the most renowned school in the locality. The school is affiliated to WBBSE and WBCHSE. The school is an authorised study centre of National Institute of Open Schooling (NIOS), Govt of India.
Tarakeswar Degree College was established at Tarakeswar in 1986.
Vivekananda Mahavidyalaya, Haripal, a general degree college, established at Haripal in 1966.
Singur Government College, a general degree college, was established at Singur in 2013.
Kabi Sukanta Mahavidyalaya, a general degree college, was established at Bhadreswar in 1986.
Rabindra Mahavidyalaya, a general degree college, was established at Champadanga in 1971.
Khalisani Mahavidyalaya, a general degree college, as established at Khalisani, Chandannagar, in 1970.

Healthcare
The table below (all data in numbers) presents an overview of the medical facilities available and patients treated in the hospitals, health centres and sub-centres in 2014 in Hooghly district.  
 

.* Excluding nursing homes

Medical institutions in Chandannagore subdivision are as follows:
Hospitals: (Name, location, beds)
Chandannagar Subvisional Hospital, Chandernagore Municipal Corporation, 250 bedsRupali Nandi Cancer Research Centre, Chandernagore Municipal Corporation, 30 beds  
Gourhati ESI Hospital, Champdany Municipality, 216 beds

Rural Hospitals: (Name, block, location, beds) 
Tarakeswar Rural Hospital, Tarakeswar CD Block, Tarakeswar, 60 bedsHaripal Rural Hospital, Haripal CD Block, PO Khamarchandi, 30 bedsSingur Rural Hospital, Singur CD Block, Singur, 60 beds

Primary Health Centres: (CD Block-wise)(CD Block, PHC location, beds) 
Tarakeswar CD Block: Duttapur (4 beds), Talpur (10 beds).
Haripal CD Block: Bandipur (10 beds), Olipur (6 beds), Chapsara, Hurat (6 beds).
Singur CD Block: Bajemelia, PO Gopalnagar (10 beds), Balarambati (10 beds), Bora (10 beds).

Private Hospitals:* (Name, location, beds)
Bhadreswar Municipal Hospital, Telenipara, Bhadreswar, 100 beds
.* Excluding nursing homes

Electoral constituencies
Lok Sabha (parliamentary) and Vidhan Sabha (state assembly) constituencies in Chandannagore subdivision were as follows:

References

Subdivisions of West Bengal
Subdivisions in Hooghly district